Lieutenant General Lữ Mộng Lan (born 28 September 1927) served in the Army of the Republic of Vietnam (ARVN).

Life
Lữ was born in Quang Tri, Vietnam.

In 1944, he earned a Diplome D'Etudes Primaires Superieures Indochinoise (DEPSI), from Lycee Khai Dinh, located in Hue. In 1957, he graduated from Command and General Staff School, Fort Leavenworth.

He served as Commander of II Corps and 2nd Tactical Zone (CTZ) since March 1, 1968. He also served as Company commander, 1951; Deputy Battalion commander, 1952; Regimental Chief of Staff, 1954; Division Chief of Staff, 1955; Deputy Chief of Staff for Operations, JGS, 1958; Commander, 25th Infantry Division, 1962; 23rd Infantry Division, 1964; 10th Infantry Division, 1965; - Chief, General Office of Military Instruction, JGS, 1966 and Commandant, Defense College, 1967. In 1970, he was a commander of II Corps in the Cambodian Campaign.

By the end of 1965 the US advisers to the 10th Division regarded General Lan as "moody and vacillatory" and "a marginal commander who would have to be worked with." They gave Lan high marks for his "perceptiveness and dexterity in civil affairs and troop morale" but saw his interest in local politics as too distracting. Although they found his three regimental commanders "capable and willing people," they felt that it was too early to judge if the Division was going to jell into a fighting unit. COMUSMACV General William Westmoreland predicted that combined operations with the US 1st Infantry Division and the 173rd Airborne Brigade would inspire the Division to higher standards. In 1968 But he succeeded Nguyễn Phước Vĩnh Lộc as II Corps commander, he was not necessarily regarded as an improvement by MACV. As commander of the 25th, 23rd and 18th Infantry Divisions between 1962 and 1966, he had received poor ratings from almost all of his American advisers, and, since September 1966, had served as the deputy chief of staff for training and director of the Central Training Command. He was, however, an ardent Thiệu supporter and could be expected to follow the dictates of the Saigon government more closely than his predecessor.

Awards and decorations
 National Order of Vietnam
 Army Distinguished order, 1st class
 Air Force Distinguished Service order, 2nd class
 Navy Distinguished Service order, 2nd class
 10 gallantry Crosses with palm
 2 gallantry Crosses with gold star
 1 gallantry Crosses with silver star
 1 gallantry Crosses with bronze star
 Air gallantry Medal with gold wing
 Hazardous Service Medal
 Armed Forces Honor Medal, 1st class
 Leadership Medal
 Staff Service Honor Medal
 Training Service Honor Medal
 Civil Actions Honor Medal
 Good Conduct Medal

References

Further reading

External links
A Sense of Urgency
Vietnamization: FA Assistance Programs

Army of the Republic of Vietnam generals
Non-U.S. alumni of the Command and General Staff College
Recipients of the Gallantry Cross (Vietnam)
Recipients of the National Order of Vietnam
1927 births
Possibly living people